The name Concert Mayol refers to a former cabaret situated at 10  in the 10th arrondissement of Paris.

Opened on the site of the former convent of the Filles-Dieu by MM. Valentin Fournier under the name Concert parisien, this café-chantant was an important venue to perform in for the artists of that period: Paulus in 1882 (direction Musleck) then, from 1894 under the direction of Dorfeuil, Yvette Guilbert, Dranem, Max Dearly, etc. It is the place where Félix Mayol made his Parisian debut 1 May 1895. The entrance was then at 37 rue du Faubourg-Saint-Denis.

Once he had become famous, Mayol acquired the establishment in 1909 and gave it the name Concert Mayol. Having moved the main entrance rue de l'Échiquier, he produced shows of which he was the star and in turn launched young artists including , Maurice Chevalier and Raimu.

Gina Palerme, Marie Dubas, Lucienne Boyer, Fernandel, Parisys and many other French artists performed in that venue. In 1933  succeeded him and, after renovation, created an operetta that enjoyed great success. In 1934, André Denis and Paul Lefebvre specialized in "nude" reviews. After World War II, it did not find its audience back and vegetated in presenting strip-tease shows until it definitively closed down in 1976.

See also 
 List of former or demolished entertainment venues in Paris

Sources 
 Félix Mayol, Mémoires (souvenirs racontés à Charles Cluny), Louis Querelle, Paris, 1929
 André Sallé, Philippe Chauveau, Music-hall et Café-concert, Bordas, Paris, 1985.
 François Caradec, Alain Weill, Le Café-concert (1848-1914), Fayard, Paris, 2007 

Former theatres in Paris
Cabarets in Paris
Theatres in the 10th arrondissement of Paris